General Atlantic (also known as "GA") is an American growth equity firm providing capital and strategic support for global growth companies, headquartered in New York, United States. The firm was founded in 1980 as the captive investment team for Atlantic Philanthropies, a philanthropic organization founded by Charles F. Feeney, the billionaire co-founder of Duty Free Shoppers Ltd.

As of November 2021, General Atlantic has over $86 billion in assets under management and focuses on investments across five sectors, including Technology, Consumer, Financial Services, Healthcare, and Life Sciences. The firm has 185 investment professionals based in New York City, Stamford, Palo Alto, Sao Paulo, London, Munich, Amsterdam, Beijing, Hong Kong, Mumbai, Shanghai, Mexico City, Singapore, and Jakarta.

History

General Atlantic was founded in 1980 as the captive investment team inside of Atlantic Philanthropies, founded by billionaire Charles F. Feeney a co-founder of Duty Free Shoppers Group. Two of the world’s richest men, Bill Gates and Warren Buffett, credit Feeney as a major inspiration for both the $30 billion-strong Bill & Melinda Gates Foundation and the Giving Pledge, which has enlisted more than 90 of the world’s richest to (eventually) grant half their wealth to charity.

The firm was initially led by CEO Edwin Cohen, previously a partner of McKinsey & Company. Cohen was joined by Steven A. Denning, also from McKinsey & Company, as a founding member of the firm. Steven Denning served as General Atlantic’s CEO from 1995 to 2006 and is now Chairman Emeritus. William (Bill) E. Ford, who joined the firm in 1991, is the current Chairman and CEO of General Atlantic. In November 2019, General Atlantic announced the appointments of Gabriel Caillaux, Martín Escobari, and Anton Levy to Co-Presidents of the firm, expanding its senior leadership team with the newly-created roles. In December 2019, General Atlantic's Global Co-Head of Financial Services Paul Stamas was selected as one of GrowthCap's Top 40 Under 40 Growth Investors of 2019.

General Atlantic focused initially on investments in computer software, oil and gas exploration, real estate and retailing. Among the firm's first major investments was United Health Services, which tripled in value in three years for the firm. By the late 1980s, General Atlantic began to expand its funding sources to include other family offices, as well as foundations and endowments.

Coincident with General Atlantic's expansion of its funding source, the firm began exploring expanding its presence overseas. Starting in 1999, General Atlantic began to open offices in Europe and Asia and currently has 14 offices globally. In 2018 General Atlantic invested in UK investment start-up Greensill Capital in an attempt to challenge traditional lending systems. In 2019 the firm continued its investments in EMEA region by acquiring majority share in Kiwi.com.

Investments
General Atlantic backed Royalty Pharma ahead of the company's 2020 IPO, which was among the largest U.S. IPOs that year and was the second-largest pharmaceutical listing ever. The firm also expanded its footprint in Asia in 2020 with an $870 million investment in India's digital services platform Jio Platforms.

In 2018, General Atlantic entered into a joint venture, Nucom ecommerce, with German mass media company ProSiebenSat.1 Media. Later that year, NuComn purchased U.S.-based online dating website eHarmony.

References

External links
 

Investment companies based in New York City
Private equity firms of the United States
Financial services companies established in 1980